Hohler is a surname. Notable people with the surname include:

Bob Hohler, American journalist
Erla Bergendahl Hohler (1937-2019), Norwegian archaeologist
Franz Hohler (born 1943), Swiss writer
Gerald Hohler (1862–1934), British barrister and politician
Thomas Hohler (1871–1946), British diplomat